Three Jacks and a Beanstalk may refer to:

 Three Jacks and a Beanstalk, an episode of The New Three Stooges
 Three Jacks and a Beanstalk, an episode of Rugrats